Commonly referred to as the "Guardianship Convention", the Convention of 1902 relating to the settlement of guardianship of minors, along with the other Conventions in 1902, was the Hague Conference's first effort at addressing international family law. It was the first form of family law which would stay relevant for decades afterwards; it was also the only family law treaty that was expressly preserved and revived in the Treaty of Versailles and other post World War I peace treaties.  The Guardianship Convention was written only in French and, with the Boll case, is the only Convention of the Hague Conference to ever be the principal subject of interpretation before a court with worldwide jurisdiction.

Parties
As of 2016, seven states are party to the convention: Belgium, Italy, Luxembourg, Poland, Portugal, Romania and Spain. Six others: France, Germany, Hungary, the Netherlands, Sweden and Switzerland have denounced the convention.

Other Conventions of 1902 
Convention of 12 June 1902 relating to the settlement of the conflict of the laws concerning marriage
Convention of 12 June 1902 relating to the settlement of the conflict of laws and jurisdictions as regards to divorce and separation

References

External links
Full text of the Convention (French)
ratifications

Hague Conference on Private International Law conventions
Treaties concluded in 1902
Treaties entered into force in 1904
Treaties of Belgium
Treaties of the Kingdom of Italy (1861–1946)
Treaties of Luxembourg
Treaties of Congress Poland
Treaties of the Kingdom of Portugal
Treaties of the Kingdom of Romania
Treaties of Spain under the Restoration
Family law treaties
Child custody
1902 in the Netherlands